Western Sydney Regional Organisation of Councils (WSROC) (pronounced 'wesrock') is one of the oldest Regional Organisations of Councils or ROCs in NSW, Australia. It was formed in November 1973 to represent the councils of Western Sydney and to advocate for the people of the region. Its current membership includes 8 of the 13 Greater Western Sydney councils, making it one of the largest NSW Regional Organisations of Councils

Membership 

The following councils make up WSROC:

 Blacktown City Council
 Blue Mountains City Council
 Cumberland Council
 Hawkesbury City Council
 City of Lithgow
 Liverpool City Council

The WSROC region covers 8, 872 square kilometres and had an estimated resident population as at 2016 OF 2,175,338.

History 

The Whitlam federal Labor government elected in 1972 had a strong interest in regions and formed the Department of Urban and Regional Development. In 1973 the department introduced a program to promote regional co-operation between councils, identifying 76 regions across Australia.

These regions were also intended to be a vehicle for federal funding for local services and infrastructure to bypass the largely non-Labor state governments of the time. However, by the time the Labor government was sacked in 1975, only 13 of these regional organisations had received substantial funding and of these ROCs only two continue to operate.

One of the two ROCs to survive is WSROC. At the time of its formation in 1973, councils in Western Sydney had already been meeting in a number of informal groupings to discuss their concerns. These largely centred on the failure of state governments in the postwar era to provide infrastructure and services such as hospitals, public transport and tertiary education to match the region's rapidly growing population.

These concerns coincided with the Whitlam government's interest in regional co-operation and provided the basis for WSROC's ongoing support by its member councils even after the demise of the Labor government.

WSROC employed its first staff member in 1977 and became a company limited in 1991. Although most of the other Whitlam-era ROCs eventually folded, WSROC itself became a model for the formation in the 1980s and 1990s of a number of other ROCs. WSROC remains distinct from most other ROCs, however, because of its continued strong emphasis on research and advocacy.

WSROC's achievements 

WSROC has been cited as one of Australia's most successful ROCs. These assessments refer primarily to the organisation's regional advocacy role and those campaigns which were successful usually also involved a number of other key partners, including community organisations and the councils themselves.

Key campaigns and other WSROC regional initiatives include:

 "Beds to the West" campaign (1970s and 80s) for more hospital beds and other health services in the region.
 Campaign to create the University of Western Sydney (1980s).
 Creation of a regional group apprenticeship and training scheme, WSROC Training & Employment (1980s).
 Lobbying to establish the Greater Western Sydney Economic Development Board (1990s)
 The Western Sydney Vision Statement (1994) which was the first attempt to create an alternative regionally-based model for metropolitan planning. The Statement also articulated a proposal for a regional system of dedicated bus and light rail corridors which later formed the basis for the region's bus transitways (T-ways).
 Lobbying to create a Minister for Western Sydney in the NSW government (1997)
 TeamWest (1997–2002) a "virtual organisation" comprising key regional stakeholders, which attempted to identify common goals and priorities as a basis for joint advocacy.
 Fast-tracking of the Westlink M7 Motorway (2000s). WSROC joined with a number of other organisations including the NSW Chamber of Commerce, the GWS Economic Development Board and the NRMA to lobby the federal and state governments to bring forward construction of the motorway.
 FutureWest (2001–2005) a major project involving research into the issues affecting the region and local areas and the development of a regional planning and management framework setting out 10 key strategic directions for spatial planning. 
 "Authoring Contemporary Australia – A Regional Cultural Strategy for Greater Western Sydney" (2005) focused on the relationship between culture, identity and the built environment and sought to strengthen the "soft" cultural infrastructure of the region.
 Sub-regional employment strategies (2008). Development of the strategies was undertaken for WSROC and its member councils by the University of Western Sydney to support the employment development components of the Sydney Metropolitan Strategy.

In addition WSROC prepares State and Federal Election Issues Papers, comprising a set of one-page sheets identifying up to ten key issues for every major policy area. These are distributed to the candidates and leaders of all the major parties in the run-up to each election, with the issues papers and the party responses published on the WSROC website.

Not all of WSROC's campaigns have succeeded, but even in these cases the organisation has usually had some impact on the policy debate. The organisation's advocacy has probably been least effective in relation to persuading state governments to make major investments in the region's public transport infrastructure, though WSROC was involved in the successful campaigns for the Westlink M7 Motorway, the South West Rail Link and the North West Rail Link which have been completed.

Structure 

All member councils make an equal annual contribution to the operating costs of WSROC and have equal voting rights on the organisation's board, which is its primary decision-making body.

The WSROC board comprises two voting directors from each member council who serve a four-year term concurrent with their councillor terms. The directors in turn elect the organisation's president and other executive positions. The organisation is supported by a small regional secretariat. Several professional committees made up of staff from member Councils also assist in implementing the work program.

The Board sets WSROC's strategic plan and work program through a planning forum held every four years and regularly reviewed. The work program centres on WSROC's primary role – to lobby for the councils and communities of Western Sydney – but the organisation also undertakes a number of other "typical" ROC roles such as regional project development and management, resource sharing between councils and supporting regional joint purchase initiatives.

WSROC's Mission Statement 

"Our mission is: to secure – through research, lobbying and the fostering of cooperation between councils – a sustainable lifestyle for the people of Western Sydney and the provision of infrastructure such that no one should have to leave the region to have access to the sorts of amenities, services and opportunities others in urban Australia take for granted."

WSROC’s Objectives 

WSROC's objectives, as set out in its Constitution, are:

 To consider the needs of the local government areas and of the people of the Western Region of Sydney and to make known those needs to the Commonwealth and New South Wales Governments and the wider community. 
 To submit to the Commonwealth and New South Wales Governments requests for financial assistance, policy changes and additional resources for the Western Region of Sydney and Members. 
 To strengthen the role of local government in regional affairs, particularly where the Western Region of Sydney may be affected by Commonwealth or New South Wales Government policy. 
 To foster co-operation between Members in addressing problems and projects of joint interest. 
 To advance the interests of the Western Region of Sydney. 
 To assist Members to carry out their duties, functions and powers under the Local Government Act, and any other statute making provision for duties, functions or powers of the Members.

WSROC alumni 

A number of politicians who were subsequently elected to state or federal parliament had key roles on the WSROC board in the early stages of their political careers.

Current examples include Chris Bowen who is the Federal Minister for Immigration and Citizenship and who served as a WSROC president, as did Paul Lynch who is the Shadow Minister for Attorney General and Justice in the NSW state opposition and Helen Westwood, a member of the NSW Legislative Council.

In 2015 former Member for Strathfield (NSW Legislative Assembly) Charles Casuscelli RFD was appointed CEO of WSROC.

See also 
 Regional Organisations of Councils
 Regions of New South Wales
 Local government areas of New South Wales
 Greater Western Sydney

References

External links 
 Western Sydney Regional Organisation of Councils (WSROC)

1973 establishments in Australia
Local government in New South Wales
Organisations based in Sydney
Organizations established in 1973
Western Sydney